Avram A. Glazer (born October 19, 1960) is an American businessman. He is a member of the Glazer family (a son of Malcolm Glazer), who own the Tampa Bay Buccaneers of the National Football League (NFL) and hold a majority ownership stake in English football club Manchester United F.C.

Early life and education
Glazer was born to Linda and Malcolm Glazer, American businessman and billionaire. He has four brothers and a sister: Kevin E. Glazer; Bryan Glazer; Joel Glazer; Darcie S. Glazer Kassewitz; and Edward S. Glazer. Glazer grew up in Rochester, New York and attended Pittsford Mendon High School. Glazer received his Bachelor of Science in Business Administration from Washington University in St. Louis in 1982 and graduated from the Washington College of Law at American University. He also studied at Peking University and Fudan University in Shanghai. He is of Jewish descent.

Career
Since 2005, Glazer has been the Executive Co-Chairman of Manchester United. Glazer was involved in the failed 2021 attempt to establish a European Super League, which would have pulled Manchester United out of the traditional European football system and placed them in a closed league without meritocratic relegation and promotion.

Avram Glazer has been an owner of the NFL's Tampa Bay Buccaneers since 1995. The Buccaneers have won two Super Bowls (Super Bowl XXXVII and Super Bowl LV) during the Glazers' tenure as owner.

It was reported in November 2022 that the Glazer family engaged Raine Group to advise on a sale of the Manchester United organization. 

From 1995 until 2009 he was also the former chairman and chief executive officer of Zapata Corporation. He was also formerly chairman and chief executive officer of both Safety Components International and Omega Protein Corporation. He was formerly a member of the board of directors of Specialty Equipment Corporation.

Personal life
Glazer helped fund the Glazer Children's Museum in Tampa, Florida. Glazer and his wife Jill also made possible the Glazer Family Club at Tulane University's Yulman Stadium. Glazer received the Distinguished Alumni award in 2013 from Washington University in St. Louis.

Glazer is married to Jill Henkin Glazer, a Tulane University graduate and former member of its board of trustees. They live in New Orleans in the Audubon Place neighborhood.

See also
Glazer ownership of Manchester United

References

Living people
American chief executives
American people of Lithuanian-Jewish descent
American soccer chairmen and investors
Manchester United F.C. directors and chairmen
Washington College of Law alumni
Olin Business School (Washington University) alumni
Glazer family
American billionaires
Jewish American sportspeople
1960 births
Tampa Bay Buccaneers owners
Washington University in St. Louis alumni